The Michigan Department of Technology, Management, and Budget, formerly Michigan  Department of Management and Budget, is a principal department of the government of Michigan responsible for various support functions within the government.

History
The Department of Management and Budget was formed in 1984 by law as a principal department of state government. Created within the department under the same law was the Office of the State Budget Director.  In 1979, the Governor created an autonomous Office of the State Employer within the department.

Under Executive Order No. 2007 - 30, the Michigan Department of Civil Service was abolished with the Board of Ethics, State Officers Compensation Commission and Civil Service Commission transfer to the department on August 26, 2007. In 2009, then Governor Jennifer Granholm planned to merge the Department of Information Technology into this Department, naming current DIT Director as Director of the merged department and the current DIT Chief Deputy Director Phyllis Mellon as temporary director of the Department of Management and Budget.  The previous director left to become senior vice president for finance and administration, Lansing Community College.  The Executive Order renaming it was effective March 21, 2010.

On January 1, 2013, DTMB started the MiTV online portal and received the Michigan Government Television channel equipment when it was closed down in mid-January. MiTV would stream sessions of the state houses and other governmental meetings in place of the MGTV PEG channel.

Components

Autonomous entity
A number of autonomous entity are assigned to the Department for budgeting and support purposes including the Civil Service Commission, a former department.

State Administrative Board

The State Administrative Board is a board of officials that oversees the administrative activities of all state departments and agencies.  The Board approves contracts and leases, state capital outlay, and hears small claims against the state.  Three standing committees (Finance and Claims Committee, Building Committee, and Transportation and Natural Resources Committee) exist to advise the Board on a course of action.

Members of the board are ex officio.  The positions are the Governor, Lieutenant Governor, Secretary of State, Attorney General, State Treasurer, Superintendent of Public Instruction and the Director of the Department of Transportation.

Office of Children's Ombudsman

The Office of Children’s Ombudsman (OCO) is an independent state office assigned to the Department of Technology, Management & Budget (DTMB). The Governor appoints the Ombudsman with the State Senate's advice and consent. The OCO takes complaints regarding the child welfare system and investigates under its own power.

Office of the State Employer

The Office of the State Employer is an independent state office assigned to the Department of Technology, Management & Budget (DTMB). The office Director is a member of the Governor's Cabinet.  The Office is the Governor's designate representative in recognized employee organization negotiations  and developing and implementing employment relations policy.  This Office after consulting with department heads makes recommendations to the Civil Service Commission regarding pay scale and other benefits for non-exclusively represented employees.

State Budget Office

The State Budget Office is an independent office within the Department led by the State Budget Director, who is a member of the Governor's Cabinet.  The Office has responsibility for the executive branch budget and oversees the state's accounting functions including payroll.

Office of Retirement Services
The Office of Retirement Services (ORS) administers defined benefit, defined contribution, hybrid, and deferred compensation retirement programs for Michigan's state employees, public school employees, judges, state police, and National Guard.

References

Technology, Management, and Budget, Department of